Katunguru, is a settlement in Rubirizi District, Ankole sub-region, in the Western Region of Uganda. The name also applies to Katunguru Sub-county and Katunguru Parish, where the settlement is located.

Location
Katunguru is just south of the equator, on the Kikorongo–Ishaka Road.

This is on the southern banks of the Kazinga Channel, which links Lake George with Lake Edward, and forms the border between Kasese District to the north and Rubirizi District to the south.

The coordinates of Katunguru, Uganda are:0°08'49.0"S, 30°03'46.0"E (Latitude:-0.146956; Longitude:30.062770).

Population
In 2015, the Uganda Bureau of Statistics (UBOS) estimated the population of Katunguru Sub-county at 3,900 people. In 2020, UBOS estimated that population to have increased to 4,200 inhabitants at mid-year. It further estimated that in July 2020, 2,400  inhabitants (57.1 percent) were males and 1,800 inhabitants (42.9 percent) were females. UBOS further calculated that the population of this locality had grown at an average annual rate of 1.5 percent, between 2015 and 2020.

Points of interest
The town serves as a gateway to Queen Elizabeth National Park, with several of the primary entrances to the park within a few kilometers.
The following points of interest are also found within the town limits or close to its edges: (a) the offices of Katunguru Town Council (b) the headquarters of Katunguru Sub-county (c) Katunguru central market, the source of daily fresh produce and (d) Katunguru Senior Secondary School.

Economy
Katunguru's primary occupation is fishing, with a daily fish market and a substantial number of small boats fishing the Kazinga Channel and nearby Lake George. Agriculture and gardening is generally not possible due to the large animals that often wander through town, including buffalo, hippopotamus and elephants. The settlement also serves the various nearby safari lodges due to its central location within the national park.

References

External links
 Pilot Water Supply Project In Katunguru, Uganda: In Queen Elizabeth National Park

Populated places in Western Region, Uganda
Cities in the Great Rift Valley
Rubirizi District